Manja Croiset (5 July 1946, Amsterdam – January 2022, Hoogland (Amersfoort)) is a Dutch poet, writer and  recitation artist.

Croiset was born on 5 July 1946, in Amsterdam. She is a second generation Shoah victim, the daughter of Shoah survivors, and youngest of three daughters. The family members of her mother, Paula Kool (March 11, 1918 – May 11, 2012), were murdered in The Holocaust. Her father,  (April 24, 1915 – November 18, 2011), son of Hijman Croiset, survived several Nazi concentration camps because of illegal printing practices including printing of Het Parool.

Early life and education 
After elementary school Manja attended Barlaeus Gymnasium, but was admitted into a psychiatric hospital at an early age. She worked at the Leidsch Dagblad, a  Dutch newspaper, for nine years.

Writing career 

Croiset started her career later in life, but wrote numerous books in a short period. Her work has some philosophical aspect. She also creates 'Manjaphorisms and other puns. The reoccurring subject lines in her books are about being a second generation Shoah victim and her life in the many different psychiatric institutions.

In 2009 she received the Elikser award and certificate from her publisher. This was the first time the prize was awarded.

Bibliography 
 1956: Pietje en Sjaantje Deel I. Jeugdwerk met eigen gemaakte tekeningen (no ISBN available)
 1956:  Mier en Kabouter Deel II. Jeugdwerk met eigen gemaakte tekeningen
 2006: Dissonante Symfonie. Verzameld werk, uitgeverij Gopher. 
 2007: Mijn leven achter onzichtbare tralies, autobiography, 
 2007: Uit de spelonken van mijn ziel, gedichten, 
 2007: Out of the caves from my soul / my life a kind of a prison, 
 2008: Croisade van een Croiset: elke droom een nachtmerrie, uitgeverij Elikser
 2008: Mijn leven achter onzichtbare tralies, heruitgave, . Er zijn ook 2 cd's van het boek. Dit  beschrijft dezelfde wereld als de debuutroman Blauwe Maandagen van Arnon Grunberg, namelijk de problematiek van de Joodse tweede generatie
 2009: Toeschouwer of deelnemer: filosoof of zonderling, gedichten/gedachten. bloemlezing, 
 2009: Knipoog in de duisternis, 
 2011: Een hart van bloedkoraal, een vervolg op de autobiografie Mijn leven achter onzichtbare tralies
 2011: Traan met een kwinkslag, bestaande uit deze titel, gedichten of gedachten, bedelares voor eeuwig, de tijdloze tijd, borrelnootjes, Manjaforismen en Manjafiques, 
 2012: Zieleroerselen van een getormenteerd mens, naar het gelijknamige weblog. Subtitel: Living on my isle of fear and loneliness. 
 2012: Wie is de vrouw in de spiegel... bloemlezing of rouwkrans, 
 2013: MC (de alleszeggende stilte/eenzame wolf), . Inclusief het boekje AGONIE
 2013: Spelen met taal. Bestaande uit: Eigen-wijsheden, Eigen-aardigheden, Manja-fiques, Ver-zin-sels. Manj-aforismen 
 2014: Over de Shoah die nooit voorbij gaat, (familie)historie, 
 2014: Spelen met taal,  Grotere uitgave 
 2014:  WOORDKUNSTENAAR niet bij letters alleen. Met eigen gemaakte illustraties. 
 2014: Over de Shoah die nooit voorbij gaat, (familie)historie, 
 2014:  Fotoboek over dans, van de schoonheid en de troost naar de VPRO serie. 
 2015: Over de Shoah die nooit voorbij gaat, (familie)historie,
 2015: Over de Shoah die nooit voorbij gaat, (familie)historie,
 2015: Manja en Klinieken of de Grote Miskenning, met foto's 
 2015: AUTHENTIEKE VERTELLINGEN door generaties heen, met foto's, Eigen beheer.
 2015: Manja en Klinieken of de grote Miskenning, hardcover, met foto's 
 2015:  My life a kind of prison with a wink in the darkness,poems and prose together her autobiography in English. A resume from the authors Dutch books., with illustrations 
 2015:  Sprookje. Heruitgave 1956 Pietje Mier en Sjaantje Kabouter. Hardcover Eigen beheer
 2015: RariteitenkabineT van manja croiseT. Met veel illustraties. Eigen beheer.

Documentary 
Dutch documentary maker Willy Lindwer made a 60-minute documentary about Manja Croiset's life, Manja – A Life Behind Invisible Bars. The movie made its debut in 2013 at the International Documentary Film Festival Amsterdam. After its debut, it was translated into English and released in the United States. Showed on Nationaal Holocaust Museum in Amsterdam April 2018 and is also in the collection of Yad Vashem included the autobiography with a Wink in the darkness. Introduced by a speech from the author.

See also 
 List of Dutch Jews

References

External links 

  Manja Croiset Blog
  
  Interview on Radio 5
  Krakatau Poems, Literary site Krakatau
  Dissionate symfonie, Jewish Historical Museum
  Nieuwsdienst: Bibliotheek begint boekwinkel van eigen schrijvers, 1 oktober 2012

1946 births
Living people
Dutch women poets
Dutch women writers
Spoken word poets
Writers from Amsterdam
20th-century Dutch women